Chevalier Antoine de Favray (8 September 1706, Bagnolet – 9 February 1798, Malta) was a French painter noted for his portraits of personalities of the Ottoman Empire, as well as paintings of Grand Masters of the Sovereign Military Order of Malta.

Life and career
In 1762, Antoine de Favray  moved to Constantinople, where he spent nine years. He painted numerous genre scenes of the everyday life in Turkey under Louis XVI, and he also depicted locals and foreign dignitaries. Especially notable are a portrait of French ambassador Charles Gravier, comte de Vergennes (1717-1787), who was living in  Constantinople between 1754 and 1768, and a portrait of Gravier's wife Annette Duvivier de Testa (1730-1798). She had previously been married to Testa, a merchand and member of a prominent Genoese family who settled in Pera for several centuries. Favray portrayed both the ambassador and his wife in rich Turkish dress.

See also
 List of Orientalist artists
 Orientalism

References

Gallery

1706 births
1798 deaths
People from Seine-Saint-Denis
18th-century French painters
French male painters
Orientalist painters
18th-century French male artists